Ichthyopterygia ("fish flippers") was a designation introduced by Sir Richard Owen in 1840 to designate the Jurassic ichthyosaurs that were known at the time, but the term is now used more often for both true Ichthyosauria and their more primitive early and middle Triassic ancestors.

Basal ichthyopterygians (prior to and ancestral to true Ichthyosauria) were mostly small (a meter or less in length) with elongated bodies and long, spool-shaped vertebrae, indicating that they swam in a sinuous, eel-like manner.  This allowed for quick movements and maneuverability that were advantages in shallow-water hunting. Even at this early stage, they were already very specialised animals with proper flippers, and would have been incapable of movement on land.

These animals seem to have been widely distributed around the coast of the northern half of Pangea, as they are known the Late Olenekian and Early Anisian (early part of the Triassic period) of Japan, China, Canada, and Spitsbergen (Norway). By the later part of the Middle Triassic, they were extinct, having been replaced by their descendants, the true ichthyosaurs.

Taxonomy

 Superorder Ichthyopterygia
? Genus Isfjordosaurus
? Family Omphalosauridae
 Family Parvinatatoridae
 Family Thaisauridae
 Family Utatsusauridae
 Eoichthyosauria
 Order Grippidia
 Order Ichthyosauria

Phylogeny
Below is a cladogram modified from Cuthbertson et al., 2013.

References

General references

 Ellis, Richard, (2003) Sea Dragons - Predators of the Prehistoric Oceans.  University Press of Kansas
 McGowan, C & Motani, R. (2003) Ichthyopterygia, Handbook of Paleoherpetology, Part 8, Verlag Dr. Friedrich Pfeil

External links

 Ryosuke Motani's detailed Ichthyosaur homepage, with vivid graphics
Eureptilia: Ichthyopterygia - Palaeos

Ichthyosauromorphs
Chordate superorders
Early Triassic first appearances
Turonian extinctions

simple:Ichthyopterygia